15 Bean Soup is a packaged dry bean soup product from Indianapolis-based N.K. Hurst Co. According to company president Rick Hurst, it is the #1 selling dry bean soup in the U.S.

Ingredients
Every package of 15 bean soup includes a seasoning packet and at least 15 of the following varieties of dried pulses:
 Northern beans
 Pinto beans
 Large lima beans
 Yelloweye beans
 Garbanzo beans
 Baby lima beans
 Green split peas
 Kidney beans
 Cranberry beans
 Small white beans
 Pink beans
 Small red beans
 Yellow split peas
 Lentils
 Navy beans
 White kidney beans
 Black beans

The soup is currently produced in ham, chicken, Cajun, and beef flavors.

See also

 List of bean soups
 List of legume dishes

References

External links
Hurst Beans official website

Bean soups
Legume dishes